Ujjini  is a village in the southern state of Karnataka, India. It is located in the kottur taluk of Vijayanagar district in Karnataka.

Marulasiddeswara Temple
The Ujjini Marulasiddeswara Temple is located here. There is a proverb used in this region "Ujjini olage nodu, Hampi horage nodu" ("It's wonderful to watch the Sculptures inside the temple of Ujjini and the same could be seen in around the Hampi Temple").
There is a unique festivity celebrated in Ujjini called "Shikara Thailabhisheka" This occurs every year in April or May.
The Cart festival is celebrated before a day of this Thailabhisheka.

This is one of the panchapeetha among Kashi, Kedar, Srishaila and Baalehonnur. Kottureshwara temple of Kottur is 14 km from Ujjini.

Connection 
Ujjini has good bus connectivity between Hospet, Chitradurga, Davanagere and Bellary.

Demographics
 India census, Ujjini had a population of 8231 with 4233 males and 3998 females.

See also
 Bellary
 Districts of Karnataka
Ujjini is also one of among the Panchapeetha. http://www.veerashaiva.org.in/Ujjaini.html.
for location map please connect to http://www.maplandia.com/india/karnataka/bellary/ujjini/

References

Venu ancestors, relatives, and friends.

External links
 http://Bellary.nic.in/

Villages in Bellary district